Mohamed Camara (born 6 April 1989) is a Guinean former footballer. He was capped twice for Guinea between 2012 and 2013.

Career statistics

Club

Notes

International

References

1989 births
Living people
Guinean footballers
Guinea international footballers
Association football midfielders
Botola players
Satellite FC players
Moghreb Tétouan players
COD Meknès players
Horoya AC players
Guinean expatriate footballers
Guinean expatriate sportspeople in Morocco
Expatriate footballers in Morocco
Sportspeople from Conakry